Prandini is an Italian surname. Notable people with this name include:

Giovanni Prandini (1940–2018), Italian politician
Jenna Prandini (born 1992), American track and field athlete
Maria Prandini (born 1969), Italian electrical engineer

Italian-language surnames